This page is a list of films that received the Golden Film since its introduction in 2001 by the Netherlands Film Festival and the Netherlands Film Fund. In 2001 and 2002, films from the Netherlands received the award once they had sold 75,000 tickets. From 2003 to date, the Golden Film is awarded to films from the Netherlands once they have sold 100,000 tickets. This page shows, for both audience criteria, which films received the Golden Film and how soon they received it after their releases.

In the following tables, the 'year' column contains the years in which the films received the Golden Film, the '#' column contains the number of the Golden Film, the 'film title' column contains the titles of the receiving films, the 'film release' column contains the dates on which the films were first released in the cinemas, and the 'Golden Film' column contains the days when the Netherlands Film Festival and the Netherlands Film Fund announced that the receiving films reached the audience criterion of the Golden Film.

When a film also received other box office awards, the award for the highest number of sold tickets is listed in the 'other' column. The Platinum Film was awarded for 200,000 sold tickets in 2001 and 2002, and is awarded for 400,000 sold tickets since 2003. The Diamond Film is awarded for 1,000,000 sold tickets since 2007. These awards can be awarded in the same year as the Golden Film or in a later year.

2001–2002

2003–present

References

External links
  Gouden Film
 Golden and Platin Film Netherlands at the Internet Movie Database

Dutch film awards
Golden
Film box office
Golden Film